Sands Hall (April 17, 1952) is an American writer, theatre director, actor, and musician.

Biography
The daughter of novelist Oakley Hall, she was born in La Jolla, California, and graduated magna cum laude with a Bachelor of Arts in Drama from the University of California, Irvine. She earned two Master of Fine Arts degrees from the University of Iowa, one in Theatre Arts and the second in Fiction from the Iowa Writers' Workshop. She also studied at the American Conservatory Theater Advanced Training Program.

Hall's writing work includes the play Fair Use, which explores the long debated plagiarism in Wallace Stegner's Angle of Repose, and the novel Catching Heaven, a Random House Reader's Circle selection and a 2001 Willa Award Finalist for Best Contemporary Fiction. She has taught writing for the University of California at Davis Extension Programs, and the Iowa Summer Writing Festival. She is currently Visiting Assistant Professor of Creative Writing at Franklin & Marshall College in Lancaster, Pennsylvania, and on the staff of the Community of Writers at Squaw Valley, California.

Her work in the theatre includes seasons at the Oregon Shakespeare Festival, Colorado Shakespeare Festival, Lake Tahoe Shakespeare Festival, the Old Globe Theatre and internationally at the Maxim Gorky Theatre in Vladivostok, Russia. She is currently an Affiliate Artist with the Foothill Theatre Company in Nevada City, California.

Music
Sands plays guitar, mandolin, and is studying the fiddle. She performs on a 000-18 Martin, her first guitar, purchased for $150 by her father when she was 14 years old. She refers to her influences as the 'three j's,' Joan Baez, Judy Collins and Joni Mitchell. When not performing her own songs, she chooses murder ballads and story songs, like "Long Black Veil," "South Coast the Wild Coast," "Red Red Rose," and "Pretty Polly."

She regularly performs with Louis B. Jones (Guitar & Vocals), Joe Fajen (Tabla), Maggie McKaig, Randy McKean (Saxophone, Clarinet), Luke Wilson, and Greg Spatz (fiddle, guitar, mandolin), Caridwen Irvine Spatz (Vocals, fiddle), Mark Childress (singer), and Nion McEvoy (percussion.

She has written and performed a number of songs, including: 
Songs for Our Daughters
Blue Hour of Love
Light a Candle for Freedom
O Joy Divine of Friends
Rustlers Moon
Dancin Through the Heavens
You Made Me Believe in Love Again

O Joy Devine of Friends is inspired by Edward Carpenter's words inscribed in the mantel of Ansel and Virginia Adams 1930 San Francisco home (131 24th Avenue, San Francisco, CA), "O Joy Divine of Friends."

She regularly performs at the annual Community of Writers at Squaw Valley workshop.

Bibliography

Books
Flunk. Start. (2018)
Tools of the Writer's Craft (2005)
 Catching Heaven (2000)

Plays
 Fair Use (2001 Premiere, Foothill Theatre Company)
Little Women, adapted from the novel by Louisa May Alcott, (1999 Premiere, Foothill Theatre Company)

Short fiction
Silver Dagger, Green Mountains Review, Spring 2009
Hide and Go Seek, Iowa Review, December 2008

Essays
Snow Tahoe Quarterly Magazine, Winter 2009.
Two Trees Tahoe Quarterly Magazine, Spring 2008.
Making Workshops Work, Workshop in a Book, Chronicle Books, 2007.
The Stacks, Open to All, 2007.
Banning Juliet, Women's Literary Salon, Spring 2007.
Dialogue Without Words, Now Write!: Fiction Writing From Today's Best Writers and Teachers, 2006.
The Literary Life of Mary Hallock Foote, California State Library Foundation Bulletin, Winter/Spring, 2006.
Mary Hallock Foote & Wallace Stegner, Idaho Magazine, Fall 2004.
Foreword: Sierra Songs and Descants: Prose and Poetry of the Sierra, 2003.
Fair Game, or Fair Use?, Art Matters, Spring, 2001.
Abject Naturalism: Lessons from a Tough Workshop, THE  WORKSHOP: Seven Decades of the Iowa Writer's Workshop, 1999.
A Stolen Life, Wild Duck Review, 1996.
A Tide of Metaphor, Wild Duck Review, 1995.
The Meanders of Sands: Essays on Writer's Craft, Omnium Gatherum of the Community of Writers at Squaw Valley, annual column 1995–2004.

References

External links
Official Website 
Inkwell Management literary agency
Franklin & Marshall College faculty page
Foothill Theatre Company

1952 births
Living people
21st-century American novelists
20th-century American dramatists and playwrights
American theatre directors
American women novelists
American women dramatists and playwrights
21st-century American women writers
20th-century American women writers